Leesville College Historic District is a national historic district located at Batesburg-Leesville, Lexington County, South Carolina. It encompasses 28 contributing buildings associated with the Busbee Brothers’ School and the Leesville English and Classical Institute. The district includes institutional and residential buildings in a range of vernacular Victorian architectural styles.

It was listed on the National Register of Historic Places in 1982.

References

Historic districts on the National Register of Historic Places in South Carolina
Victorian architecture in South Carolina
Buildings and structures in Lexington County, South Carolina
National Register of Historic Places in Lexington County, South Carolina